Timothy Bellavia (born 1971) is an American children's author, fabric artist and educator. Bellavia is best known for his education  research through his We Are All the Same Inside children's book series and accompanying Sage doll.

Career
Timothy Bellavia has collaborated with several non-profit organisations including Sesame Workshop, Mattie J.T. Stepanek Foundation, and the Herbie Hancock Institute of Jazz. He was a recipient of Education Update’s Outstanding Educator of the Year Award, won several arts and digital education awards and now serving as an integral part of the five year research project to highlight the importance of integrating STEAM (Science, Technology, Engineering, Arts and Mathematics) topics into elementary school's curriculum. 

The five-year research project, entitled Young Academic Music (YAM)  is funded through an Education Innovation Research (EIR) grant from the Office of Elementary and Secondary Education (OESE).

Timothy is an Assistant Professor of the Graduate School of Education at Touro University in New York City .

Awards and nominations

|-
| 1997
| Skowhegan School of Painting and Sculpture Artist Residency 
| Fellowship Grant Award
| 
|-
| 2001
| We Are All the Same Inside
| Christopher Award 
| 
|-
| 2003
| Young Adult Institute
| YAI Educator of the Year Award
| 
|-
| 2009
| Pieces of Ice 
| Lambda Literary Foundation Award
| 
|-
| 2016
| Outstanding Educator of the Year
| Education Update Award
| 
|-
| 2017
| 38th Annual Flushing Town Hall / Smithsonian Affiliate Gala 
| Honouree: Abundant Heart Award
| 
|-
| 2021
| New York Foundation for the Arts
| City Artist Corps Grant Award
| 
|-
| 2021
| Non-Broadcast Short Form Web Video for "Treble Leads the Class"
| Viddy Award
| 
|-
| 2021
| Creative Art Direction for "Treble Leads the Class"
| MarCOM Gold Award
| 
|- 
| 2022
| Outstanding Digital Animation Creation (Platinum) for "Treble Leads the Class"
| Ava Digital Award
| 
|-
| 2022
| Video Creativity / Outstanding Animation for "Treble Goes A'Go-Go" 
| Hermes Creative Award
| 
|-
| 2022
| Motion Graphics / Design for "Treble Catches the Rhythm Train"
| Telly Award
| 
|-
| 2022
| Non-Broadcast: 2-D Animation for "Treble Catches the Rhythm Train"
| Telly Award
| 
|-
| 2022
| Outstanding Education Website
| dotCOMM Award
| 
|-
| 2022
| Outstanding Writing for Animation Short for "Treble Catches the Rhythm Train" 
| Emmy Award
| 
|-
| 2022
| Outstanding Animation Education Short for "Treble Catches the Rhythm Train"
| Emmy Award
| 
|-
| 2022
| Arts Educators' Learning Lab: Celebrating the Creation of
Culturally Responsive Practices in Education Spaces 
| New York City Arts in Education Roundtable Grant
| 
|-
| 2022
| Outstanding Education Animation for "Treble Catches the Rhythm Train"
| MarCOM Platinum Award
| 
|- 
| 2022
| Creative Art Direction  for "Treble Goes A'Go-Go"
| MarCOM Gold Award
| 
|- 
| 2023
| Outstanding Digital Animation Creation (Platinum) for "Treble Goes A'Go Go"
| Ava Digital Award
|  
|- 
| 2023
| Outstanding Motion Graphics (Platinum) for "Treble Catches the Rhythm Train"
| Ava Digital Award
|  
|-

Selected works

Children's picture books
  We Are All the Same Inside (2000)
  Come and Abide (2002)
  Theo and the Sisters of Sage!  (2003)
  Sage Goes to Kindergarten (2006)
  Paper, Scissors & Magic - Seven Ways to Get Kids to Love Books (2007)
  The Inside Story – Commemorating the 10th Anniversary of Sage and acclaimed doll-making workshop (2009)
  La historia por dentro (2011)
  Vu de l'interier (2011)
  We Are All the Same Inside Curriculum – Activities, Stories, Doll Patterns and More! (2018)
  Tales at Luv Micheal: The Big Idea (2020)
  Treble Leads the Class - with Susan Courey (2021)
  Treble Catches the Rhythm Train - with Susan Courey (2021)
  Treble Goes 'A Go-Go - with Susan Courey (2022)

Young Adult
 Pieces of Ice - with Kristin Walsh (2009)

Personal life
Bellavia was born May 1, 1971 in Buffalo, New York and grew up in Waterport, New York. He is the third of four siblings, including singer-songwriter Rand Bellavia of Ookla the Mok (band) and Staff Sargent David Bellavia the recipient Congressional Medal of Honour. 

He graduated from Roberts Wesleyan University in Rochester, New York and earned an MFA from Pratt Institute in Brooklyn, New York. He then moved to Manhattan working as a teaching artist, model, and as a backup dancer for Cyndi Lauper, before landing a job as a curator at the Lower East Side Tenement Museum in New York City.

Bellavia was awarded a scholarship fellowship grant to attend Skowhegan School of Painting and Sculpture in 1997, completed Fashion Institute of Technology's Creative Enterprise Ownership Program (M.B.A.) in 2000 and is the author of several children's picture books, including Treble Leads the Class, Paper Scissors and Magic: 7 Ways to Get your Kids to LOVE Books and the award- winning We Are All the Same Inside.

Bellavia married production designer and writer Dino DeGuiceis on November 8, 2017 .

T.I.M.M.-E. Company
The T.I.M.M.-E. Company. Inc. (Tolerance in Multi Media Education) was founded in 2000 by Bellavia to promote peace, tolerance and acceptance. The T.I.M.M.-E. Company is the publisher of We Are All the Same Inside and has developed an early childhood human diversity school curriculum with tolerance-teaching dolls featured in Bellavia's children's picture books. In 2003, Bellavia presented his curriculum at the United Nations on the International day of Tolerance in co-operation with the Anti-Defamation League and the We Are Family Foundation. The theme of his address was Educating Our Children For A Safer World. His presentation to the United Nations council was also later broadcast by Court TV and TruTV.

The T.I.M.M.-E. Company has conducted  workshops in conjunction with the New York City Department of Education to teach tolerance, peace and acceptance to New York City's school children while integrating the arts into the literacy curriculum. Continuing a partnership that began in 2004 with Sesame Reads Annual Literacy Day, the T.I.M.M.-E. Company participated in celebrating the 105th anniversary of CLC (The Children's Learning Center) on September 21, 2007 in  Stamford, Connecticut. The highlight of the event was an appearance by Rosita, Abby Cadabby and some Honkers. Other Sesame Workshop speakers included the award-winning animator Jim Jinkins, creator of Global Thingy and Pinky Dinky Doo.

We Are All the Same Inside
We Are All the Same Inside is a 2000 children's picture book by Timothy Bellavia, which earned a Christopher Award nomination for Best Children's Picture Book. 2010 marked the tenth anniversary publication of We Are All the Same Inside and the Sage doll-making workshop. A special 10th anniversary version of the book was released in 2010. The reissued picture book featured paper doll patterns, teacher curriculum, a 10-year chronology, and rare photographs. To commemorate the anniversary, singer, songwriter and former Motown Records producer Sherlie Matthews co-wrote and co-produced a special children's multi-track compact disc. The Brooklyn Historical Society hosted a We Are All the Same Inside Sage doll-making workshop on October 24, 2010.

The Sage Doll
A patented doll invented by Timothy Bellavia in 1998 consisting of interchangeable fitted coverings onto which alternative characters have been sewn, painted, silk-screened or otherwise attached. The Sage doll has illustrated internal organs and lacks any of the identifiable external characteristics such as a human would have, including skin, hair or clothing. Alternative coverings, which may be added to the doll, portray different characters with characteristics of sex, race, religion, nationality and personality. The Sage doll is intended for use as an educational tool to demonstrate the interrelationship between the inner anatomy of a human (heart, lungs, internal features) and the outer anatomy (skin, hair and facial features). The Sage doll demonstrates to both children and adults that while outer appearance may vary greatly, the dolls and by analogy, human beings, are substantially the same inside.

Young Academic Music Research Group
Young Academic Music and Computational Thinking (YAM) is a five-year research project funded through an Education Innovation Research (EIR) grant from the United States Office of Elementary and Secondary Education (OESE). The project highlights the importance of integrating STEAM (Science, Technology, Engineering, Arts and Mathematics) topics into elementary school's curriculum. The curriculum, notably features a series of children's picture books and animated videos: "Treble Leads the Class" (2021), "Treble Catches the Rhythm Train" (2021) and "Treble Goes A 'Go-Go" (2022) all written, conceived and produced by P.I. (Principal Investigator) Susan Courey with Touro University Assistant Professor Timothy Bellavia in partnership with the Herbie Hancock Institute of Jazz. Herbie Hancock, himself narrates the three whimsical stories of music notes, which come alive to attend school together. The award-winning education series was created by the collaborative efforts of Mika Shino (producer), T.I.M.M.-E. Company (design concepts), Atomic Kid Studios (animators), CJ Emmons the principal singer of ABC's Dancing with the Stars (voice overs), and Nick Vayenas (music).

Filmography

Notes

References
Martinez, Michael. "Sherlie Matthews sings on We Are All The Same Inside, CD Launch Held 10/24." Broadway World
Bellavia, Timothy D. The Inside Story – Commemorating the 10th Anniversary of Sage and acclaimed doll-making workshop (2009)

External links

 Timothy Bellavia website
  Pieces of Ice
 Talent Spotlight Magazine
 T.I.M.M.-E. Co. INC. website
  We Are All The Same Inside Sage Doll-making Workshop 
 GSE Professor Timothy Bellavia Presents Sage Doll Test at Education Conference website
 Prof. Timothy Bellavia: Beyond Skin Deep website
 FCCA TEACHING ARTIST: Timothy Bellavia website
 US Patented Doll with Interchangeable Parts
 Timothy Bellavia Honored at Smithsonian Affiliate Gala 
 Timothy Bellavia Receives Outstanding Educator of the Year at Harvard Club of New York 
 Courage, Humour and a Life Saving Decision 
 YAM
 The Sage Doll

American children's writers
American educators
Living people
Roberts Wesleyan University alumni
1971 births
Fashion Institute of Technology alumni
Pratt Institute alumni
Skowhegan School of Painting and Sculpture alumni